The M1 highway is a road in Moldova connecting the border with Ukraine near Dubău to the border with Romania at Leușeni, passing through Chișinău and Dubăsari.

Route description
The first section, from Dubău to Chișinău via Dubăsari (57 km), used to have a different route number assigned (M21) until a government decision in 2016 decommissioned the number and integrated the route into the M1. South of Dubăsari, the road connects to the M4 highway, providing a connection to other cities administered by the separatist Transnistrian government, including the capital Tiraspol. Immediately after the roundabout, the road leaves the separatist-controlled territory, then heads south-west towards Chișinău, where it has a complex interchange with the M2 and M5 highways in the northern part of the capital city.

The road then forms Chișinău's north-western bypass as it reaches the intersection with the R6, which links Ialoveni to the M1 highway. The road then heads towards the Romanian border at Leușeni, meeting with the republican roads R44, R25 and R33, which connect Hîncești, Nisporeni and Călărași, respectively, with the M1 highway.

On its western end, it links to Romania's DN24B towards Huși, while on its eastern end it links to Ukraine's Highway M13 towards Kropyvnytskyi. On the Romanian side, immediately after the border crossing at Leușeni, the road connects also with DN28, towards the Romanian city of Iași.  The road is thought as the main connection between Chișinău and Bucharest and other Romanian cities and further in the European Union as well.

See also
Roads in Moldova
Transport in Moldova

References

Gallery

Roads in Moldova